National Institute of Technology Warangal (NIT Warangal or NITW) is a public technical and research university located in Warangal, India. It is recognised as an Institute of National Importance by the Government of India. The foundation stone for this institute was laid by then Prime Minister Jawaharlal Nehru on 1959, the first in the chain of 31 NITs (formerly known as RECs) in the country. The institute was renamed as the National Institute of Technology, Warangal in 2002.

History
The Regional Engineering College, Warangal was the first to be established (in 1959) among the chain of 15 Regional Engineering Colleges in the country. The approval of the Government of India to establish one of the RECs meant for the southern region of Warangal was conveyed to the State Government through its letter no .F 11- 5/ 58- T. 5 dated 30 January 1959. The Government of Andhra Pradesh through G. O. Ms. No. 2440 (Education Department) dated 15 July 1959 constituted the first board of Governors of the Regional Engineering College, Warangal, appointing Dr. D.S. Reddy (then Vice-Chancellor of Osmania University) as the chairman. The foundation stone for the college was laid by Pandit Jawaharlal Nehru on 10 October 1959 in Kazipet. The classes for the first batch of students in Civil, Electrical and Mechanical Engineering branches commenced on 12 September 1959 in temporary sheds erected in the Balasamudram area of Hanamkonda. Later temporary sheds were also erected in the Industrial Colony of Warangal for conducting lecture classes. Laboratory classes and workshop classes were conducted in the Government Polytechnic, Warangal in the initial stages. The conduction of classes on the premises of the permanent site in Kazipet commenced in January 1963.

The bachelor's programme in Chemical Engineering was initiated in 1964. The following year saw the start of the Metallurgical Engineering programme. In 1971, the college started the undergraduate program in Electronics and Communication Engineering. BTech in Computer Science & Engineering was started in 1983 and MTech in Computer Science & Engineering in 1987. In 2006, the institute started a bachelor's program in Biotechnology.

In 1976, its affiliation was changed from Jawaharlal Nehru Technological University to Kakatiya University, with which it remained affiliated until the institute was granted deemed university status in 2002.

In 1994, the institute was selected by the Overseas Development Administration of the UK for exchange programs between the UK and India in the field of information technology. This program ran till 1999. In 2000, the institute started its MBA program.

In 2001, a centre of Software Technology Parks of India was opened in its campus.

In September 2002, the college was renamed as National Institute of Technology and was given deemed university status.  NITW was given the status of Institute of National Importance (INI) on 15 August 2007.

Campus

Dr VA Sastry Centre for Innovation and Incubation

NIT Warangal has a centre established with the objective of providing laboratory space for start-up industries. Future Now Innosoft (p) ltd and Sky e it solutions have started their activities in this centre. The Lakshya Foundation, an alumni-led organization, also has its office set up here. M/s Infosys (p) ltd. funded a research project which is carried out in this centre by the faculty and students of NIT Warangal. CUSMAT, A Virtual Reality-based startup also has emerged at the Centre for Innovation and Incubation, NIT Warangal.

It also houses the Web and Software Development Cell (WSDC), a team of students which develop the institute website, semester registrations, online feedback, online attendance, online mess and hostel allotment (OMAHA) among many other things.

Center For Innovation And Incubation
The Innovation Garage is a 24x7 student-run multidisciplinary workspace for innovation. This innovators space provides students access to the latest gadgets, tools and technology devices. It is a joint initiative of the institute and Lakshya Foundation.

Other facilities
State Bank of India is situated beside the campus main gate and has two ATMs – one located in the bank premises and the other near the Sports Stadium. The institute has one shopping centre which caters to the needs of the students and residents. The campus has a post office located near Viswesvraya Hall. The NITW campus comes under a separate postal zone and it is a postal delivery office. The dispensary has an X-ray machine, an ECG and a pathology laboratory with equipment like an electronic BP apparatus with pulse reader, a mini lab, an electronic binocular microscope, and a sterilization oven.

Academics

Admission
Bachelor of Technology admissions for Indian students are based on the Joint Entrance Examination (JEE – Main). Foreign students are accepted through Direct Admission of Students Abroad (DASA) and ICCR schemes.

MTech students are admitted through the Graduate Aptitude Test in Engineering (GATE). MCA students are admitted through the NIT MCA Common Entrance Test (NIMCET). Admissions to the MBA program is based on Common Admission Test (CAT) or Management Aptitude Test (MAT) scores, and short listed candidates undergo group discussion or a personal interview for the final selection. MSc and MSc (Tech.) students are admitted through the National Institute of Technology Warangal Entrance Test (NITWET). Admissions in various MSc courses is also done on the basis of marks scored in JAM(Joint Admission test for MSc)  through CCMN.

NIT Warangal invites applications for PhD degree admissions in almost all departments twice every academic year, in July and December.

Rankings

NIT Warangal was ranked 19th among engineering colleges in India by the National Institutional Ranking Framework (NIRF) in 2020 and 46th overall.

Student life

Festivities
NIT Warangal holds technical and cultural events throughout the year. Major annual events include Technozion (technical fest), SpringSpree (cultural fest) and Cura (management fest). The event called Zero Gravity is held every year, which is an interbranch competition in cultural events.

 Technozion
Technozion is a three-day annual technical symposium organized by the student fraternity of the National Institute of Technology, Warangal, and is aimed at providing a platform for students across India to assemble, interact, and share knowledge in various fields of science and technology. Started in 2006, it has a footfall of over 6000 students. It is a collection of events, initiatives, workshops, guest lectures, and exhibitions. Its name comes from "techno" for technology and "Zion" meaning the promised land.

 Springspree
Springspree is an annual cultural festival of the National Institute of Technology, Warangal. It is organized by the student fraternity of NIT Warangal. This cultural fest has a footfall of around 10,000 and participation of around 600 colleges. It started in 1978.

 CURA
Cura  is  a  momentous  management  event  organised  by  the  students  of  School  of  Management, NIT Warangal. Cura signifying  "Thoughtfulness"  is  a  platform  that  started  to  unleash  the  potential  of  the management aspirants  all  over  India.

Notable alumni
 Padma Kuppa, State Representative of Michigan's 41st House of Representatives district in the United States
 Pushmeet Kohli, Head of Research at Google DeepMind, highly cited researcher in machine learning and computer vision 
 Sujatha Gidla, Author
 Siva S. Banda, Director of Control Science Center of Excellence and Chief Scientist for Air Vehicles Directorate at United States Air Force Research Laboratory; elected to National Academy of Engineering; President's Award for Distinguished Federal Civilian Service in 2010
 Lalit Goel, Professor of Electrical Engineering, Nanyang Technological University 
 V. V. Lakshminarayana, former Joint Director for India's Central Bureau of Investigation
 Kavuri Sambasiva Rao, Member of Parliament, India (5th term, 8th, 9th, 12th, 14th, 15th Lok Sabha
 Madhura Sreedhar Reddy, director, producer, Telugu cinema
 S.P.Y. Reddy, Member of Parliament, India (2nd term, 14th, 15th Lok Sabha)
 Rao Remala, first Indian employee of Microsoft
 Ramajogayya Sastry, film lyricist, winner of Filmfare Award for Best Lyricist – Telugu
 Biswanath Rath, film director, screenwriter, editor and producer
 Nambala Keshava Rao, General Secretary of Communist Party of India (Maoist)
 Sudhir Kumar Mishra, Director General of the Defence Research & Development Organisation (DRDO)
 Arvind Kumar, CEO of Dukes India
 Kartikeya Gummakonda, Actor
 Sadanala Ramakrishna, Maoist 
 Shreya Dhanwanthary, Actress
 K Gowri Shankar, Group Director of G&G Group of Companies

See also
 List of educational institutions in Telangana
 List of institutions of higher education in Telangana
 List of National Institutes of Technology in India

References

External links
 

National Institutes of Technology
Educational institutions established in 1959
Universities and colleges in Telangana
Engineering colleges in Telangana
Education in Warangal
University departments in India
Business schools in Telangana
All India Council for Technical Education
1959 establishments in Andhra Pradesh